Barrio López Benítez is a small western suburb of the city of Melo in the Cerro Largo Department of eastern Uruguay.

Geography
The stream Arroyo Conventos flows a small distance to the east of the suburb.

Population
In 2011 Barrio López Benítez had a population of 522.
 
Source: Instituto Nacional de Estadística de Uruguay

References

External links
INE map of Melo, Hipódromo, Barrio López Benítez and Barrio La Vinchuca

Populated places in the Cerro Largo Department